Thiara cancellata is a species of freshwater snail, a gastropod mollusk in the family Thiaridae.

Description
The length of the shell attains 23.7 mm.

Distribution
This marine species occurs off the Philippines

Human use
It is a part of ornamental pet trade for freshwater aquaria.

References

 Swainson, W. (1824). Description of two new and remarkable freshwater shells, Melania setosa and Unio gigas. The Quarterly Journal of Science, Literature and the Arts, 17(33): 13-17
 Starmühlner, F. (1976). Beiträge zur Kenntnis der Süßwasser-Gastropoden pazifischer Inseln. Ergebnisse der Österreichischen Indopazifik- Expedition des 1. Zoologischen Institutes der. Universität Wien. Annalen des Naturhistorischen Museum in Wien. 80: 473-656.
 Benthem Jutting, W. S. S. van. (1958). Non-marine Mollusca of the island of Misool. Nova Guinea: A Journal of Botany, Zoology, Anthropology, Ethnography, Geology and Palaeontology of the Papuan Region. 9 (1): 293–338.

External links
 Röding, P. F. (1798). Museum Boltenianum sive Catalogus cimeliorum e tribus regnis naturæ quæ olim collegerat Joa. Fried Bolten, M. D. p. d. per XL. annos proto physicus Hamburgensis. Pars secunda continens Conchylia sive Testacea univalvia, bivalvia & multivalvia. Trapp, Hamburg. viii, 199 pp

Thiaridae
Gastropods described in 1898